The Dark Crystal: Age of Resistance is an American fantasy television series produced by Netflix and The Jim Henson Company. It is a prequel to the 1982 Jim Henson film The Dark Crystal that explores the world of Thra created for the original film. It follows the story of three Gelflings: Rian, Deet, and Brea, as they journey together on a quest to unite the Gelfling clans to rise against the tyrannical Skeksis and save their planet Thra from a destructive blight known as the Darkening. The series premiered on August 30, 2019, to critical acclaim. In September 2020, it was announced that the series had been canceled after one season.

Premise
On the planet Thra, three Gelflings – Rian, Brea, and Deet – inspire a rebellion after discovering a horrifying secret behind their customarily worshipped rulers, the Skeksis, that threatens their entire planet.

Cast

Main cast

Resistance

Skeksis

Supporting cast

Gelfling

Skeksis and urRu/Mystics

Others

Additional voices by Warrick Brownlow-Pike, Dave Chapman, Stewart Clarke, Kevin Clash, Alice Dinnean, Barbara Drennan, Damian Farrell, Louise Gold, Beccy Henderson, Isabella Laughland, Omar Malik, Sarah Beck Mather, Jack Myers, Mark Restuccia, Irfan Samji, Helena Smee, Katherine Smee, Neil Sterenberg, Olly Taylor, and Victor Yerrid.

Additional puppeteers included; Don Austen, Marcus Clarke, Richard Coombs, Ronnie Le Drew, Phil Fletcher, Andy Heath, Sarah-Jane Honeywell, Steven Kynman, Steve Nallon, Angie Passmore, Michael Windsor, and Fran Wright amongst others.

Episodes

All episode titles are quotes from the original 1982 film.

A feature-length documentary, The Crystal Calls – Making The Dark Crystal: Age of Resistance, was released on Netflix on August 30, 2019. It was directed by Randall Lobb and features interviews with the cast, including Egerton, Dormer and Pegg.

Production

Pre-production
Initially conceived as a feature-length sequel to The Dark Crystal titled The Power of the Dark Crystal, the project was for years in a state of development hell. In 2012, director Louis Leterrier expressed an interest in joining Jim Henson Productions in their project shortly after the release of Clash of the Titans, hoping to interest large studios, but was repeatedly turned down as, according  to him, they were only interested in Transformers, and many executives had never heard of The Dark Crystal. It was during this impasse that Leterrier decided to shoot a prequel series rather than a film sequel because of the richness of material available in Jim Henson and Frank Oz's notes on the events leading up to the original film. Lisa Henson identified the "Wall of Destiny" from the original film as a "jumping point": "What was that culture? What was lost? What was that beautiful Gelfling civilization?" Jeff Addiss, Will Matthews and Javier Grillo Marxuach, all fans of The Dark Crystal, were subsequently hired as writers. The project was eventually sold to Netflix after Leterrier found a studio executive who shared the team's enthusiasm for the original film.

The production was pitched to Netflix as an animated prequel series. Upon hearing the idea, Vice President of Original Content Cindy Holland rewatched the film and asked about the possibility of doing the series in live-action, much to the Henson Company's surprise. A short test film, featuring a puppet Skeksis and a CGI Gelfling, was produced in 2016 to test potential improvements the series could have over the film. Ultimately, the test convinced the Henson Company and Netflix that the series needed puppet characters.

Development
In May 2017, it was announced that The Jim Henson Company, in association with Netflix, would produce a prequel to the film The Dark Crystal. The series, written by Jeffrey Addiss, Will Matthews, and Javier Grillo-Marxuach, began filming in the United Kingdom in November 2017 with Louis Leterrier serving as director.

At New York Comic Con in 2018, Leterrier insisted that the series would depend on puppetry and not CGI, except for the use of green screens to remove puppeteers. On December 17, 2018, the 36th anniversary of the original film's release, the voice cast was revealed, as well as some images of the main Gelfling characters. On May 30, 2019, Netflix released a teaser trailer and poster for the series, announcing its official release date on August 30, 2019. Additional voice actors were announced on June 26, including Awkwafina, Lena Headey, Hannah John-Kamen, Sigourney Weaver and Benedict Wong. Similar to the original film, voiceovers for the series were recorded after the bulk of filming was done, with the voice actors having to match their performances to both the lip movements and scratch track voices of the puppeteers.

Design
The puppets were fabricated in early 2017 in Jim Henson's Creature Shop in Los Angeles, then exported to Langley Studios just outside London, with The Muppets veteran Dave Goelz and The Dark Crystals concept artist Brian Froud participating in performing and designing the characters. Aside from Froud's new sketches, the original film's tie-in book, The World of the Dark Crystal, was used as a reference point. Other sources of inspiration in building the world of Thra included Game of Thrones and Avatar: The Last Airbender.

According to design supervisor Toby Froud, the show makes use of 20 principal puppets, with an additional 90 for secondary roles. Unlike the original film, the Gelfling puppets require only two puppeteers, as opposed to four in The Dark Crystal, thus permitting greater freedom of movement. Also, while the animatronic components of the original film's Gelfling puppets were controlled via cables, the mechanical parts of the new Gelflings were remotely operated via a modified Wii controller.

Marketing
On May 30, 2019, the first teaser trailer for the series was released and received a generally favorable response with Tasha Robinson, writing for The Verge, writing, "what's most compelling about this trailer, though, is the stunning fidelity to the original film".

Reception
The series has gained widespread acclaim. On review aggregator website Rotten Tomatoes, the series has an 88% "certified fresh" rating with an average score of 8.6/10, based on 78 reviews. The website's critical consensus reads, "An epic fantasy adventure that will please old and new fans alike, Age of Resistance expertly builds on the lore of The Dark Crystal, crafting compelling new mythos without losing sight of the humanity at the story's heart." On Metacritic, the series has a weighted average score of 82 out of 100, based on 20 critics, indicating "universal acclaim".

In a positive review for RogerEbert.com, critic Matt Fagerholm referred to the series as "quite simply, one of the all-time great fantasy epics, as well as the masterwork of puppetry most closely aligned with Jim Henson’s humanistic philosophy since his son Brian helmed 1992’s holiday perennial, The Muppet Christmas Carol." Matt Zoller Seitz of Vulture similarly praised the series, saying: "Age of Resistance is like an immense, ten-hour magic show, engrossing down to the very last wondrous detail. This is an altogether staggering artistic achievement, and a joyful continuation of the Henson tradition."

In a mostly positive review, Keith Phipps of TV Guide stated that "Age of Resistance is, in many respects, an extraordinary accomplishment. Which isn't to say it doesn't run into some problems along the way."  In a more mixed review for The Daily Telegraph, Ed Power wrote, "There are real pleasures to be had watching beautiful puppets running, kissing and poking each others' eyes out. But the Dark Crystal is in such a hurry to create a splash it plunges off the deep end too soon."

Accolades

Video game
During a Nintendo Direct at E3 2019, it was announced that a video game based on the Netflix series, called The Dark Crystal: Age of Resistance Tactics, was in development by BonusXP and En Masse Entertainment. The game was released on February 4, 2020, for Nintendo Switch, Xbox One, PlayStation 4, Microsoft Windows, and macOS. It was released in Japan on May 7, 2020.

Future
On September 2, 2019, IndieWire reported that Addiss and Matthews were interested in and prepared for a possible second season: in an interview, Matthews said, "If we are lucky enough to get more seasons then the story will go on and we know where it's going and it's maybe more hopeful than you might think," with Addiss noting, "We also have a concrete document for season two. So we are ready to go."

However, on September 20, 2020, it was announced that the series would not be renewed for a second season. Lisa Henson stated, "We know fans are eager to learn how this chapter of The Dark Crystal saga concludes and we'll look for ways to tell that story in the future."

On February 10, 2022, TV Head of The Jim Henson Company Halle Stanford stated "We are nimble, we are resilient. We are ready to jump. The minute anyone would like to jump back into Thra [“The Dark Crystal” planet setting], it is a world that we will continue to build on and think about."

Notes

References

External links

2010s American children's television series
2019 American television series debuts
2019 American television series endings
High fantasy television series
American children's fantasy television series
American prequel television series
American television shows featuring puppetry
The Dark Crystal
Netflix children's programming
English-language Netflix original programming
Live action television shows based on films
Television series set on fictional planets
Television series by The Jim Henson Company
Television series by Sony Pictures Television